The Act 9 Geo 1 c 22, commonly known as the Black Act, or the Waltham Black Act, and sometimes called the Black Act 1722, the Black Act 1723, the Waltham Black Act 1722, the Criminal Law Act 1722, or the Criminal Law Act 1723, was an Act of the Parliament of Great Britain. It was passed in 1723 in response to a series of raids by two groups of poachers, known as the Blacks. The Act was expanded over the years and greatly strengthened the criminal code by specifying over 200 capital crimes, many with intensified punishment. Arson, for example, was expanded to include the new crime of burning or the threat of burning haystacks.

Also, the legal rights of defendants were strictly limited. For example, suspects who refused to surrender within 40 days could be summarily judged guilty and sentenced to execution if they were apprehended. Local villages were punished if they failed to find, prosecute and convict alleged criminals.

The Act originated in the aftermath of the South Sea Bubble collapse and the ensuing economic downturn. The Blacks gained their name from their habit of blacking their faces when they undertook poaching raids against landowners. They quickly demonstrated both "a calculated programme of action, and a conscious social resentment", and their activities led to the introduction of the Black Act to Parliament on 26 April 1723. The Act came into force on 27 May and introduced the death penalty for over 350 criminal offences, including being found disguised in a forest and carrying a weapon, and "no other single statute passed during the eighteenth century equalled [the Black Act] in severity, and none appointed the punishment of death in so many cases". A criminal law reform campaign in the early 19th century caused it to be largely repealed on 8 July 1823, when a reform bill introduced by Robert Peel came into force.

The Building Act 1774, which imposed restrictions on exterior decoration, was also known as the Black Act.

Background

Following the 1720 South Sea Bubble collapse, Britain suffered an economic downturn that led to heightened social tensions. A small element was the activity of two groups of poachers that were based in Hampshire and Windsor Forest respectively. The first flurry of activity came from the Hampshire group and began in October 1721 when 16 poachers assembled in Farnham to raid the park of the Bishop of Winchester. Three deer were carried off and two others killed. Four of the poachers were later caught, with two released for lack of evidence and the others pilloried and sentenced to a year and a day in prison. The poachers became known as the "Blacks", because of their practice of blackening their faces to prevent identification. Most famously, the Hampshire groups were the "Waltham Blacks". After the convictions, the poachers decided to attack the Bishop's property again, which demonstrated "a calculated programme of action, and a conscious social resentment" that distinguished them from normal poachers. In reprisal, 11 deer were taken and many more killed, which led to a royal proclamation offering £100 for information that led to the arrest of the gang.

More raids followed, highlighting a "fairly direct class hatred", and culminated in the raid of a shipment of wine ordered for Frederick, Prince of Wales. That proved to be the final straw, with Sir Francis Page, a "notorious hanging judge", sent to the Winchester Assizes to preside over any prosecutions, which forced the Hampshire Blacks underground. The Windsor Blacks then began their activities and copied the Hampshire group. Their main target was Caversham Park, owned by the Earl of Cadogan, with a series of increasingly-audacious raids in 1722 and 1723, including one in which a gamekeeper's son was killed. The government introduced the Black Act, formally "An Act for the more effectual punishing wicked and evil disposed Persons going armed in Disguise and doing Injuries and Violence to the Persons and Properties of His Majesty's Subject, and for the more speedy bringing the Offenders to Justice", to Parliament on 26 April 1723. It came into force on 27 May.

Act
The Act dealt with any offender who was armed and with a blacked face, armed and otherwise disguised, merely blacked, merely disguised, accessories after the fact or "any other person or persons". Anyone in one of the above categories found in a forest, chase, down or Royal Park could be sentenced to death. Similarly, it was an offence to hunt, kill, wound or steal deer in those locations, with the first offence punishable by a fine and the second by penal transportation. Other criminalised activities included fishing, the hunting of hares, the destruction of fish-ponds, the destruction of trees and the killing of cattle in those locations, the last of which also punishable by death. An offender could also be executed for setting fire to corn, hay, straw, wood, houses or barns or shooting another person. The same penalties applied to attempting to rescue anyone imprisoned under the Black Act or attempting to solicit other people to participate in crimes that violated it. In total, the Act introduced the death penalty for over 350 criminal acts.

Aftermath
Three of the Blacks' leaders had already been captured during the passage of the Act although one later escaped, and a series of raids captured a total of 32 Blacks who were tried after the Act's passage in Reading. Four were sentenced to death for the killing of the gamekeeper's son, with the executions occurring on 15 June 1723. Trials for the others continued into 1724, and seven more were captured and tried on 7 December. That marked the effective end of the Blacks as an organised group. At the time, it was thought that the Blacks were Jacobites, with Sir Robert Walpole encouraging the ideas to advance his own interests. The rationale for the Act has been described as "at least as much to do with the hysteria induced by Walpole ... as with any need for new powers to fight deer-stealing".

Modern scholars have differed in their view of whether the Blacks were Jacobites. Some argue that the links between the Blacks and the Jacobites were "fantasies" and that the Blacks were "simply a mixed group of foresters: labourers, yeomen and some gentry defending their customary rights". Others, however, have claimed that the Blacks were closely connected with Jacobitism and that the Black Act was designed to combat that political threat.

In March 1723, Philip Caryll was arrested by the government for drinking to the Old Pretender's health in the home of the latter's former nurse in Portsea, Portsmouth. An innkeeper of Horndean testified that Caryll held meetings at his inn with the former Tory MP Sir Henry Goring, who fled to France after the Jacobite Atterbury Plot had been discovered in August 1722. It quickly became known to the Dutch ambassador that Goring had requested from the Waltham Blacks support for a Jacobite rising. The ambassador wrote that the Blacks were originally a group of smugglers and that their Jacobite allegiance was the primary reason for the passing of the Black Act. Goring wrote to the Pretender on 6 May 1723:

As late as the Jacobite rising of 1745–46, newspapers reported that the Blacks had reappeared in Hampshire, where they had stolen deer and robbed parks.

Sir Geoffrey Elton claimed that the Act was "passed not in order to suppress legitimate protest but because organized gangs were destroying deer and planning a Jacobite rising". The Act has been described as "severe and sanguinary", and L. Radzinowicz noted in the Cambridge Law Journal that "no other single statute passed during the eighteenth century equalled [the Black Act] in severity, and none appointed the punishment of death in so many cases". Efforts to repeal it started in 1810, with comments by William Grant as part of a wider debate on penal reform. A formal recommendation for its repeal took almost a decade, with the publication of the Report on Criminal Laws in 1819 that marked the first "official" suggestion that the law be removed from the statute books. Following the publication of the Report, Sir James Mackintosh introduced a law reform bill that would have repealed the Act, but although it passed through the House of Commons, it was strongly opposed in the House of Lords. In 1823, he submitted a memo to the House of Commons, again to suggest the repeal of the Act, and a few months later, Robert Peel, the Home Secretary, introduced a bill that repealed the entirety of the Black Act except for the provisions that criminalised setting fire to houses and shooting a person. The repeal passed and came into effect on 8 July 1823. The Black Act was repealed by the Criminal Statutes Repeal Act 1827.

See also
 Bloody Code

References

Bibliography

Paul Kleber Monod, Jacobitism and the English People, 1688–1788 (Cambridge University Press, 1993).

Further reading

 
 
 
Joseph Chitty. A Treatise on the Game Laws and on Fisheries. First Edition. 1812. Volume 1. Pages 514 to 522. Second Edition. Samuel Brooke. 1826. Pages 513 to 521.
Welsby and Beavan (eds). Chitty's Collection of Statutes. London. 1851. Volume 2. Pages 561 to 564.
James Fitzjames Stephens (ed). Roscoe's Digest of the Law of Evidence in Criminal Cases. Seventh Edition. 1868. Pages 83, 269, 273, 275, 276, 278, 366, 367 and 485.

Great Britain Acts of Parliament 1723
Legal history of England
Repealed Great Britain Acts of Parliament
Hunting and shooting in England
Capital punishment in the United Kingdom
Masks in law
Deception
Face